Hastings Island is one of the Bonvouloir Islands in the Louisiade Archipelago. Administratively, it is located in Milne Bay Province of Papua New Guinea.

References

Islands of Milne Bay Province
Louisiade Archipelago